Dunungen is a 1941 Swedish historical drama film directed by Weyler Hildebrand and starring Karin Nordgren, Adolf Jahr and Hilda Borgström. It is based on the 1914 play of the same title by Selma Lagerlöf inspired by an earlier story of hers, which had previously been made into a 1919 silent film. It was shot at the Råsunda Studios in Stockholm and on location at Nyköping. The film's sets were designed by the art director Arne Åkermark.

Cast
 Karin Nordgren as	Anne-Marie Ehinger
 Adolf Jahr as 	Teodor Fristedt
 Hilda Borgström as 	Gunilla Fristedt
 George Fant as 	Mauritz Fristedt
 Gaby Stenberg as 	Elisabet Westling
 Viran Rydkvist as 	Frida
 John Ericsson as 	Karl-Otto
 Wiktor Andersson as Wilhelmsson, gardener 
 Åke Claesson as 	Borgström
 Eric Gustafson as Sekter Kolmodin
 Yngve Nyqvist as 	Fristedt, mayor
 Millan Bolander as 	Mrs. Fristedt
 Olle Hilding as 	Ehinger
 Stina Ståhle as 	Mrs. Ehinger
 Astrid Bodin as 	Beata, housemaid 
 David Erikson as Liljesson, policeman 
 Ingemar Holde as Baker's boy 
 Magnus Kesster as 	Johan 
 Ingrid Luterkort as 	Teodor's maid 
 Julius Mengarelli as Dancer at the party 
 Artur Rolén as 	Nyberg 
 Birger Sahlberg as 	Westling, Elisabeth's father

References

Bibliography 
 Goble, Alan. The Complete Index to Literary Sources in Film. Walter de Gruyter, 1999.
 Iverson, Gunnar, Widding Soderbergh, Astrid & Soila, Tytti. Nordic National Cinemas. Routledge, 2005.

External links 
 

1941 films
1941 drama films
1940s Swedish-language films
Films directed by Weyler Hildebrand
Swedish historical drama films
1940s historical drama films
Films set in the 19th century
Films based on works by Selma Lagerlöf
1940s Swedish films